The eighth generation of the Ford F-Series is a line of pickup trucks and light- to medium-duty commercial trucks produced by Ford from 1987 to 1991. While the 1980 cab and chassis was carried over to the new model, the 1987 model was more streamlined, and maintenance items were made simpler. The exterior was facelifted with new composite headlamps, a more aerodynamic front end, and circular fenders. Inside, the interior was given a complete redesign. Rear antilock brakes were now standard, the first pickup truck to boast this.  For the first time, all models were produced with straight-sided Styleside beds; the Flareside bed was discontinued except for a small number of early 1987 models using leftover 1986 beds with new circular fenders. In 1991, Ford premiered the 9th gen taillights (the white reverse light was decreased in size) on the last year of the 8th generation.

Trims

Custom - Included: Vinyl upholstery, black steering wheel, chrome front bumper, black grille, hubcaps, foldaway mirrors, and an electronic AM radio with digital clock and two speakers.
XL - Added: Cloth and vinyl upholstery, swingaway mirrors, front bumper rub strip, color-keyed floor mat, a door trim panel with map pocket, and a color-keyed headliner.
XLT Lariat - Added: Cloth upholstery, chrome grille, sport wheel covers, tinted glass, carpeting, and leather wrapped steering wheel.
Nite (1991)

For 1991, a "Nite" trim package was introduced. It included all blacked-out exterior trim, either a pink or blue/purple stripe, and a "Nite" decal on the sides of the cargo box.

Models 

Eighth-generation Ford F-Series models are:
 F-150: 1/2 ton (6,250 lb GVWR max)
 F-250: light-duty 3/4 ton (7,700 lb GVWR max)
 F-250HD: 3/4 ton (8,800 lb GVWR max)
 F-350: 1 ton Class 2 or Class 3 truck (10,000 lb GVWR max)
 F-Super Duty: Class 4 truck (14,500 lb GVWR max)

The new-for-1987 F-Super Duty was essentially a Class 4 truck built as a chassis cab, with an aftermarket bed (specific to its future use) added after the truck was built. The F-Super Duty came with dual fuel tanks with a dash-mounted toggle switch to switch between each tank, while using only a single fuel gauge. It came with a PTO used to power attachments, such as winches or a dump bed, directly from the transmission. F-Super Duty models were rated at about  GVWR and came with either the standard 7.5 L (460 CID) gas V8 or the optional 7.3 L (444 CID) diesel V8. All wheels were 10-lug with dual wheels in the rear. The transmission was a three-speed automatic, with the four-speed electronically controlled E4OD as an option beginning in 1990. This model should not be confused with the later Super Duty commercial line of trucks starting with the 1999 model year.

Powertrain and chassis
In a move to further update the F-Series engine lineup, the 4.9 L inline-6 was converted to fuel injection for 1987. A year later, Ford became the first pickup truck manufacturer to sell a fully non-carbureted engine lineup as the 5.8 L V8 and 7.5 L V8 also gained fuel injection (the 5.0 L V8 had gained fuel injection as an option for 1985 and this was made standard in 1986).

While the dated 3-speed column-mounted manual transmission was discontinued, much of the rest of the transmission lineup carried over from the 1980-1986 trucks. In 1988, the five-speed ZF S5-42 replaced the Borg-Warner T19 in F-250 and F-350 models. For the F-150 and light-duty F-250, the heavier-duty Borg-Warner T18 4-speed manual remained available, while the Mazda-built M5OD 5-speed manual was added to the model lineup for 4.9 L inline-6 and 5.0 L V8-equipped models.

Four-wheel-drive improvements included the addition of automatic locking hubs for the F-150 in 1989. Models with the 5.0L V8 also had an option of a "Touch Drive" electronic transfer case.

From 1980 through 1996, Ford offered a four-wheel-drive swing arm independent front suspension called Twin Traction Beam (TTB). Based on its two-wheel-drive twin I-beam suspension from 1965, Ford mounted a Dana 44 or Dana 50 differential in the driver-side front axle beam and transmitted torque to the passenger-side wheel with a U-jointed axleshaft. TTB coil springs were still used on the F-150, while the four-wheel-drive F-250 and F-350 got leaf springs. The F-250 received TTB Dana 50 axles, and the F-350 a solid Dana 60 axle.

Engines:

References

8th generation
Pickup trucks
Rear-wheel-drive vehicles
All-wheel-drive vehicles
Cars introduced in 1986
1990s cars
Flexible-fuel vehicles
Motor vehicles manufactured in the United States
Cars discontinued in 1995